The Circular Electron Positron Collider (CEPC) is a proposed Chinese electron positron collider for experimenting on the Higgs boson.

CEPC was proposed by the Chinese Academy of Sciences' Institute of High Energy Physics in 2012. The design was produced by a team of international physicists.  Development and site selection were proceeding in 2018. Construction would begin in 2022, with experiments starting in 2030. It is expected to cost .

Description
CEPC is projected to have a maximum center-of-mass energy of 240 GeV. It will be located  underground, and have two detectors. The electron-positron collisions will allow clearer observations than the proton-proton collisions of the Large Hadron Collider (LHC).

After 2040, the collider could be upgraded into the Super Proton-Proton Collider with collision energies seven times greater than the LHC.

Physics program
The CEPC enables a wide physics program. As an electron-positron collider, it is suited to precision measurements, but also has strong discovery potential for new physics. Some possible physics goals include:
 Higgs measurements: Running slightly above the production threshold for ZH, the CEPC is a Higgs factory. Over the course of a ten-year run, it is planned to collect 5 ab−1 with two detectors, which corresponds to approximately one million produced Higgs Bosons. One target is to be able to measure the ZH production cross-section  to 0.5% accuracy. Other goals include the measurement of the Higgs Boson self coupling, and its coupling to other particles.
 When running at the Z peak, a precision measurement of the Z Boson mass and other properties, e.g. the Zbb̅  coupling, can be made.
 Physics beyond the Standard Model: Despite the lower center-of-mass energy compared to the LHC, the CEPC will be able to make discoveries or exclusions in certain scenarios where the LHC cannot. A prominent situation is when there is supersymmetry, but the masses of the superpartners are very close to each other (near-degenerate). In this case, when one SUSY particle decays into another plus a Standard Model particle, the SM particle will likely escape detection in a Hadron collider. In an e+e- collider, since the initial state is completely known, it is possible to detect such events by their missing energy (the energy carried away by SUSY particles and neutrinos).

See also

 Large Electron–Positron Collider - LEP was the highest energy lepton collider ever built
 Compact Linear Collider – another post-LHC linear particle accelerator planned at CERN
 International Linear Collider – another post-LHC linear particle accelerator planned in Japan
 Future Circular Collider – a proposed 100 TeV circular collider at CERN

References

External links 
 Record for CEPC on INSPIRE-HEP
Particle physics facilities
Particle experiments
Science and technology in China
Proposed particle accelerators